The Adirondack Bank Center at the Utica Memorial Auditorium is a 3,860-seat multi-purpose arena in Utica, New York, with a capacity of 5,700 for concerts. Nicknamed the Aud, it is the home arena of the Utica Comets, the AHL affiliate of the NHL's New Jersey Devils, and Utica City FC of the MASL.

In 2011, the Utica Memorial Auditorium was designated as a National Historic Civil Engineering Landmark by the American Society of Civil Engineers in recognition of its innovative cable suspended roof.

History
The Utica Memorial Auditorium was conceived by then-Utica mayor John T. McKennan, who believed that the city needed a place for entertainment and sporting events. McKennan and the administration that he hired to plan out the process, led by Frank M. Romano, then hired Gilbert Seltzer, a well-known architect at that time, to draw up plans for the building. A site was found along the old Erie Canal, and groundbreaking took place April 15, 1957. The arena was constructed using the world's first pre-stressed dual cable roof system, designed by Lev Zetlin (who would later partner with architect Philip Johnson to construct both the New York State Pavilion "Tent of Tomorrow" seen at the 1964 World's Fair and the Munson-Williams-Proctor Arts Institute, also located in Utica, NY) with "struts" between the cables. John A. Roebling's Sons Company developed the tensioning method for the project. Zetlin's design became the predecessor to the many modern dome designs seen today, and has since influenced many other tensile structures including Madison Square Garden. Seltzer would take the most pride in constructing "The Aud", saying, "This was the first successful use of cables for a roof structure."

"The Aud" was also one of the first stadiums to have telescopic seats. Telescopic bleachers (the bleachers pulled out from below higher levels) were common in stadiums, but Zetlin requested more comfortable seating for the arena.

Work continued through 1958 and into 1959. When the Auditorium was finally completed, it became one of just three arenas built without obstructed views. The arena opened on March 13, 1960, with the Greater Utica Industrial Exposition its first event, running three evenings from March 16–19. 96 exhibitors took part in the presentation which drew an attendance of some 45,000. In 1962, it hosted the NCAA Division I Men's Hockey Championship (AKA the "Frozen Four"). In 2017, the arena hosted the Division III "Frozen Four".

Scenes from the 1977 film Slap Shot starring Paul Newman were shot at the Auditorium. The original center-hung scoreboard, as seen in the movie, was unusual in that the game time was kept by a digital clock, while the penalty time was kept by analog clocks. This was eventually replaced by a center-hung scoreboard designed by Eversan, which includes a one-line messageboard. "The Aud" also held a Santana concert on February 22, 1973 during their Caravanserai Tour, their only concert in Utica, and the arena has the distinction of being the location of one of the last scheduled Elvis Presley concerts. The concert was scheduled to be on Friday, August 19, 1977, three days after Presley's death on August 16.

In 2011, the Utica Memorial Auditorium was designated as a National Historic Civil Engineering Landmark by the American Society of Civil Engineers in recognition of its innovative cable suspended roof.

On June 14, 2013, it was announced that the Peoria Rivermen, the AHL farm team of the National Hockey League's Vancouver Canucks would be relocating to the Utica Memorial Auditorium for the 2013–14 season as the Utica Comets. As the AHL has a strong presence in Western and Central New York State, the league agreed to the move, citing the move would further boost the league's strength in the Northeast while further cutting down on travel expenses. On October 23, 2013, the Comets played at "The Aud", losing 4–1 to the Albany Devils in front of a sold out crowd. Frank Corrado scored the first Comet goal on home ice.

In addition to the Comets, the Auditorium plays host to the Utica College Pioneers men's and women's ice hockey teams that play in the United Collegiate Hockey Conference of the NCAA Division III, the Skating Club of Utica, the Jr. Comets youth hockey program and several high school varsity ice hockey teams. It was the former home for the Mohawk Valley Comets of the North American Hockey League, the Mohawk Valley Stars/Comets of the Atlantic Coast Hockey League, the Utica Devils of the American Hockey League, the Utica Blizzard, Utica Bulldogs, and Mohawk Valley Prowlers of the United Hockey League, and the Mohawk Valley IceCats of the North Eastern Hockey League. Both Pioneer hockey teams boast the highest average attendance for a Division III hockey team in the United States, with regular season games frequently selling out.

In recent years, "The Aud" has earned high rankings from various hockey circles, earning the #8 spot in "The 10 Coolest Hockey Rinks in the World" list by Complex Magazine, the #8 rank for best AHL arena by Stadium Journey, and #4 in the Pure Hockey Blog's list of the top 6 places to skate for hockey.

Photos and renderings of the Utica Memorial Auditorium are on permanent display at New York's Museum of Modern Art. The museum's collection honors the auditorium as an architectural landmark.

On September 27, 2017, the Upper Mohawk Valley Memorial Auditorium Authority announced a 10-year naming rights deal with locally based Adirondack Bank, amending the official name of "The Aud" to Adirondack Bank Center at the Utica Memorial Auditorium.

In November 2017, work was completed on the 26,000-square-foot expansion that added a new entrance, a half-dozen executive suites, a new women's bathroom, a building-wide sprinkler system and other amenities to the facility. The $10.55 million project was fully funded by the state. A restaurant named "72 Tavern & Grill" was constructed on existing foundation on the West side of the facility that supported underground areas of the Aud. The "72" is in honor of the 72 cables that have held up the roof of the Adirondack Bank Center for more than 50 years.

On June 1, 2018, the Adirondack Bank Center hosted UFC Fight Night: Rivera vs. Moraes.

On June 13, 2018, Mohawk Valley Garden CEO Rob Esche and Major Arena Soccer League (MASL) commissioner Joshua Schaub, along with other officials, announced that Utica will field a professional indoor soccer team — called Utica City Football Club, or UCFC for short — that will play home games at the Adirondack Bank Center at the Utica Memorial Auditorium beginning with the 2018–19 season. The team had previously been known as the Syracuse Silver Knights.

High school sports
In addition to its regular season high school hockey games, the Utica Memorial Auditorium hosted the New York State Ice Hockey semi-finals and finals every year from its inception to the 2015 Championships. In August 2015, NYSPHSAA announced it would be moving the state tournament to Buffalo's HarborCenter. On March 9–10, 1973, Utica Memorial Auditorium hosted the 11th NYSPHSAA state wrestling tournament. The annual tournament has not returned to Utica since.

References

Further reading

External links
 

Basketball venues in New York (state)
College ice hockey venues in the United States
Continental Basketball Association venues
Historic Civil Engineering Landmarks
Indoor ice hockey venues in New York (state)
Indoor soccer venues in New York (state)
Mixed martial arts venues in New York (state)
Sports venues in Oneida County, New York
Sports venues completed in 1960
Utica Comets
Utica Devils
Wrestling venues in New York (state)
1960 establishments in the United States